Yakirra is a genus of Burmese and Australian plants in the grass family.

 Species
 Yakirra australiensis (Domin) Lazarides & R.D.Webster - Northern Territory, Queensland, WAU, South Australia, New South Wales
 Yakirra foliolosa (Munro ex Hook.f.) Clayton - Myanmar
 Yakirra majuscula (F.Muell. ex Benth.) Lazarides & R.D.Webster - Northern Territory, Queensland, WAU
 Yakirra muelleri (Hughes) Lazarides & R.D.Webster - Northern Territory, Queensland, WAU
 Yakirra nulla Lazarides & R.D.Webster - Northern Territory 
 Yakirra pauciflora (R.Br.) Lazarides & R.D.Webster - Northern Territory, Queensland, WAU
 Yakirra websteri B.K.Simon - Queensland

References

Panicoideae
Poaceae genera
Grasses of Asia
Grasses of Oceania